Duncote is a hamlet in the civil parish of Greens Norton  in West Northamptonshire, England. The hamlet is  North west of Towcester.

Duncote is not recorded in the Domesday Book, the name of the hamlet first appears in documentation from 1276 as Dunna's Cot. Duncote Hall is now a care home.

References

External links 
Duncote Hall listing with the Care Quality Commission

Villages in Northamptonshire
West Northamptonshire District